The Nelson Tift Building, also known as the Goodwill Building or Albany Housefurnishing Company, is a historic four-story commercial building in Albany, Georgia, United States.  It was built in 1922 specifically to display furniture.

Located at 226 W. Broad Ave., it was added to the National Register of Historic Places on June 17, 1982.(wrong link)

It is named for the founder of Albany, Nelson Tift.

References

Buildings and structures in Albany, Georgia
Commercial buildings on the National Register of Historic Places in Georgia (U.S. state)
Commercial buildings completed in 1922